West Kootenay South was an electoral district in the Canadian province of British Columbia in the 1894 election only. Its official name was "West Kootenay (south riding)". It was formed from the division of the older Kootenay riding, one of the province's first twelve constituencies, which for the 1890 election was redistributed into:
West Kootenay
East Kootenay

The West Kootenay riding was further redistributed for the 1898 election into the ridings of:
West Kootenay-Nelson, a provincial district from 1900 to 1903
West Kootenay-Revelstoke, a provincial district from 1900 to 1903
West Kootenay-Rossland, a provincial district from 1900 to 1903
West Kootenay-Slocan, a provincial district from 1900 to 1903

For other ridings with the name Kootenay, or which were in the Kootenay region, please see Kootenay (electoral districts).

Demographics

Geography

History

Notable MLAs

Election results
Note: Winners of each election are in bold.

|-

|- bgcolor="white"
!align="right" colspan=3|Total valid votes
!align="right"|659 
!align="right"|100.00%
!align="right"|
|- bgcolor="white"
!align="right" colspan=3|Total rejected ballots
!align="right"|
!align="right"|
!align="right"|
|- bgcolor="white"
!align="right" colspan=3|Turnout
!align="right"|55.37%
!align="right"|
!align="right"|
|}

Sources
Elections BC historical returns

Former provincial electoral districts of British Columbia